Yüksel Yavuz (born 1 February 1964 in Karakoçan, Turkey) is a Kurdish film director from Turkey.

Early life and education 
Since 1980, he has lived in Germany, where he lived with his father who had found work at the port of Hamburg. From 1986 to 1989 he studied sociology and economics at the University of Hamburg and from 1992 to 1996 visual communications at the Academy of Fine Arts in Hamburg.

Professional career 
His first film from 1995 he produced for the German public broadcaster ZDF and is an autobiographical documentary about the experience of his father as a guest worker and his mother, who stayed behind in the village. Since he has directed several documentaries and feature films. His movies often focus on the Kurdish diaspora and the signification of the homeland for the refugees and immigrants. Longing for Istanbul focuses on the several nationalities that have settled in Istanbul while Hope on the human rights of Kurdish people in Turkey.      

He has won a number of awards.

Personal life's involvement in the movies 
His father has acted in two of his movies, the autobiographical documentary My Father, the Guestworker and then also in Children of April. Besides a character in the movie Children of April works in a meat factory similar to one, Yavuz himself was working for a while as well. The documentary Close - Up Kurdistan involves places of his childhood in Karaçokan and an interview with a relative.

Filmography 
 1992: Hoch-Zeit
1993: Freedom Pension
1993: Coromandel 
1994: 100 und 1 Mark (Hundred and one Mark)
1995: Mein Vater, der Gastarbeiter (My Father the Guestworker)
 1998: Aprilkinder (Children of April)
 2000: Beyaz mantolu adam (Man with the white coat)
 2003: Kleine Freiheit (A little bit of freedom)
 2007: Close up Kurdistan
2010: Sehnsucht nach Istanbul (Longing for Istanbul)
2013: Hevî (Hope)

References

External links 
 Interview with Kurdish Cinema 27 February 2009
 Yüksel Yavuz's A little bit of freedom, by Deniz Gokturk, 2005
 Trailer of Close up Kurdistan on Youtube

Kurdish film directors
Turkish film directors
1964 births
Turkish people of Kurdish descent
Living people
People from Karakoçan